FC Moldova Gaz Chişinău was a Moldovan football club based in Chişinău, Moldova. They were founded with the name of Sindicat Chişinău in 1994. In their five years of existence they've played three seasons in the Moldovan National Division, the top division in Moldovan football.

Achievements
Divizia A
 Winners (1): 1996–97

References

External links
 FC Moldova Gaz Chişinău  at weltfussballarchiv.com
 FC Moldova Gaz Chişinău at DiviziaNationala.com 

Football clubs in Moldova
Football clubs in Chișinău
Defunct football clubs in Moldova
Association football clubs established in 1995
Association football clubs disestablished in 2000
1995 establishments in Moldova
2000 disestablishments in Moldova